Eupithecia oenone is a moth in the  family Geometridae. It is found in the regions of Antofagasta (Antofagasta Province), Coquimbo (Limari Province), Valparaiso (Aconcagua and Valparaiso provinces), Maule (Curico and Cauquenes provinces) and Los Lagos (Osorno, Llanquihue and Chiloe provinces) in Chile. The habitat consists of the Northern Coast, Coquimban Desert, Central Valley and Valdivian Forest biotic provinces.

The length of the forewings is about 8.5–9 mm for males and 9.5–10.5 mm for females. The forewings are white, with greyish brown scales along the costa near the base. The hindwings are white, with grey and greyish black scales. Adults have been recorded on wing in September, November, December, January and March.

References

Moths described in 1882
oenone
Moths of South America
Endemic fauna of Chile